Georgios Ioannidis (born 4 May 1988) is a Greek footballer who plays as a left-back for AE Lefkimmi.

Club career
Ioannidis is a product of the youth academies of Iraklis and started his professional career at the first team in 2006. In his four years at the club, he made 43 league appearances.

On 22 July 2010, Ioannidis moved to Panathinaikos on a free transfer, signing a three-year contract. At Panathinaikos, he met his former Greece under-19 head coach Nikos Nioplias, who was the head coach of Tryfilli at the time.

On the final days of July 2012, Ioannidis said at an interview that many teams have shown interest for him, and that the interest of AEK Athens is an honour for him. He also said that he wants to go at a club that he would play regularly.

On 21 January 2019, AE Lefkimmi announced the signing of Ioannidis.

International career
Ioannidis was a member of the Greek under-19 team who reached the final of the 2007 European under-19 championship against Spain, a game which they lost 1–0.

He was also a member of Greece under-21, as he made 12 appearances and scored one goal for the team against Macedonia under-21.

Club statistics

References

Greek footballers
1988 births
Living people
Iraklis Thessaloniki F.C. players
Panathinaikos F.C. players
OFI Crete F.C. players
Levadiakos F.C. players
Panserraikos F.C. players
Gamma Ethniki players
Super League Greece players
Footballers from Serres
Association football midfielders
Association football fullbacks